"Marieke" is a 1961 song by the Belgian singer Jacques Brel.

The song

In "Marieke" Brel sings about a Flemish girl, Marieke, whom he once loved and who lived "between the towers of Bruges and Ghent". He wants her to love him again in the "flat country of Flanders" (a reference to another song by him, "Le Plat Pays").

It is the only song where he sings both in his native French language and in Dutch, the other major language of his bilingual home country Belgium. Brel recorded a version of the song entirely in Dutch as well, with lyrics by Eric Franssen.

Covers

"Marieke" has been covered numerous times, among others by Marie Bill, Hans de Booij, Donald Cant, Judy Collins, Shawn Elliott, Jure Ivanušič, Elly Stone, Chad Mitchell, Mort Shuman, Alice Whitfield, Amanda McBroom, Des de Moor, Barb Jungr, Liza Minnelli, Danièle Pascal, Laurika Rauch, Laïs, Karin Hougard, Klaus Hoffman, Herman van Veen, Evabritt Strandberg, Michael Heltau, Gay Marshall, etc.

Brel told singers who covered "Marieke" that he didn't mind that they changed the French lyrics, but preferred the Dutch lyrics to remain intact.

Statue

In 1988 a statue was created by Jef Claerhout depicting Marieke.

References

Jacques Brel songs
1962 songs
Macaronic songs
French-language Belgian songs
Dutch-language Belgian songs
Songs written by Jacques Brel
Songs about Belgium
Songs about cities
Ghent in fiction
Bruges in fiction